O Tahiti Nui Freedom is a single-hulled Polynesian outrigger canoe. Constructed in 2010 by Hiria Ottino, it in an  voyaged from Tahiti to Shanghai an expedition in which she reversed the path of the Lapita culture and Polynesian expansion through the South Pacific.

Construction 

The design of the O Tahiti Nui Freedom was inspired by a historical plan drawn in Tahiti by Admiral Paris around 1820 (standard plank of wood and stitch construction). The design was then reviewed and modernized by a group of naval architects in order to meet the standards of modern safety while respecting the line and form of Paris' 1820 plan. This modified design was then sent to all of the intended ports of call to assure compliance with local standards.

The expedition 
The O Tahiti Nui Freedom left Tahiti with a crew of six on July 27, 2010. It arrived in Rarotonga on 4 August, and after repairs, continued on through Tonga, Fiji, Papua New Guinea and the Philippines, before arriving in Shanghai in November. While the crew used modern navigation technology rather than Polynesian navigation, the crew attempted to live authentically, eating traditional foods, carrying their own water, and subsisting off fish caught on the voyage. The tale of the voyage is recorded in the book De Tahiti à Shanghai, dans le sillage des tupuna by Michèle Lewon.

References

External links
 

Outrigger canoes
Voyaging canoes
2010 ships
Polynesian navigation
Polynesian boats